is a passenger railway station located in the town of Ino, Agawa District, Kōchi Prefecture, Japan. It is operated by JR Shikoku and has the station number "K06".

Lines

Layout
The JR station consists of a side platform serving a single bidirectional track. There is no station building, but only a shelter on the platform.

Adjacent stations

History
The station opened on 1 November 1986 as an provisional stop. With the privatization of JNR on 1 April 1987, control of the station passed to JR Shikoku and Edagawa was elevated in status to a full station.

Surrounding area
Kochi Prefectural Ino Commercial High School

See also
 List of Railway Stations in Japan

References

External links

 JR Shikoku timetable
 (Tosa Electric Railway)

Railway stations in Kōchi Prefecture
Railway stations in Japan opened in 1986
Ino, Kōchi